Al-Shabaab militants attacked an African Union Mission to Somalia base in the Leego district of Somalia and killed more than 70 African Union soldiers and seized control of their military base on 26 June 2015. A military outpost with around 100 Burundian soldiers was attacked by militants with a car bomb, machine guns and rocket-propelled grenades.

The Mail & Guardian described the attack as the "latest attack during the insurgents’ annual Ramadan fighting season." It was reported that militants beheaded survivors of the attack at the base. Footage has been released of barefoot dead soldiers and a soldier being shot.

Somali and AMISOM troops reportedly retook the base and town on 28 June while Al-Shabab withdrew and offered no resistance to them but not before beheading the local Deputy District commissioner among the captives they took.

The battle coincided with the 2015 Ramadan attacks conducted by ISIL and its sympathizers. However no direct link between the al-Shabaab attack and the other attacks that day exists.

See also
 2015 timeline of the War in Somalia

References

Conflicts in 2015
Leego 2015
2015 in Somalia
June 2015 events in Africa